José Eduardo do Prado Kelly (10 September 1904 – 11 November 1986) was a Brazilian jurist, lawyer, poet, journalist and politician. He was minister of the Supreme Federal Court, president of the Order of Attorneys of Brazil (OAB), minister of Justice and Interior Affairs, federal deputy for Rio de Janeiro and president of the National Democratic Union (UDN).

His father, Otávio Kelly, was also minister of the Supreme Federal Court.

References 

Supreme Federal Court of Brazil justices
20th-century Brazilian judges
Brazilian male poets
20th-century Brazilian poets
Brazilian journalists
Government ministers of Brazil
Ministers of Justice of Brazil
National Democratic Union (Brazil) politicians
Members of the Chamber of Deputies (Brazil) from Rio de Janeiro (state)
Federal University of Rio de Janeiro alumni
1904 births
1986 deaths
People from Niterói
20th-century journalists